"Wildest Dreams" is a song by American singer-songwriter Taylor Swift, taken from her fifth studio album, 1989 (2014). Swift wrote the song with its producers Max Martin and Shellback. "Wildest Dreams" is a synth-pop and dream pop power ballad with an atmospheric production equipped with string instruments and Swift's heartbeat as its beat. The lyrics describe Swift's plea for her lover to remember her despite the inevitable end of their relationship. The song was released to radio stations as the album's fifth single on August 31, 2015, by Big Machine and Republic Records.

Contemporary critics received "Wildest Dreams" with moderate reviews; some praised Swift's vocals and the production, while others negatively compared it to the work of Lana Del Rey. Retrospectively, critics have positively viewed the song as one of Swift's strongest songs in her catalog. The single peaked within the top five on record charts of Australia, Canada, Poland and South Africa. In the United States, it was 1989 fifth consecutive top-ten hit on the Billboard Hot 100, reaching number five, and peaked atop Billboard airplay-focused charts including Mainstream Top 40 and Adult Top 40. It was certified four times platinum by the Recording Industry Association of America (RIAA) and had sold over two million copies in the United States by November 2017.

The song's music video, directed by Joseph Kahn, is set in Africa during the classical Hollywood era of the 1950s. It depicts Swift as a brunette actress who falls in love with her co-star on set, and later realizes their inevitable end upon completion of their film project. The video was well received in terms of production and styling, but attracted criticism for glorifying colonialism, a claim that Kahn dismissed. Swift donated all proceeds from the video to the African Parks Foundation of America.

On September 17, 2021, Swift released the re-recording of "Wildest Dreams" dubbed as "Taylor's Version", as part of the re-recording of her first six studio albums following the dispute over their masters. The re-recorded song garnered more streams in its opening day on Spotify than the original song did on any given day on the streaming platform. It later debuted and peaked at number 37 on the Billboard Hot 100.

Writing and composition

Taylor Swift wrote "Wildest Dreams" with its producers, Max Martin and Shellback, who produced the bulk of Swift's fifth studio album 1989. Paul Duffus from PopMatters characterized the song as a dream pop power ballad. NME Hannah Mylrae described it as synth-pop, the genre that is in line with its parent album's production. Refinery29 writer Rebecca Farley noted elements of soft rock. The song was recorded by Michael Ilbert and MXM Studios in Stockholm, and by Sam Holland at Conway Recording Studios in Los Angeles.

Critics noted that "Wildest Dreams" incorporates a sultry, dramatic atmosphere, which they compared to the music by singer Lana Del Rey, particularly her album Born to Die (2012). According to the album's liner notes, Swift's heartbeat serves as the song's beat. The track is instrumented by pulsing synthesizers and lush string instruments. The track's string arranger, Mattias Bylund, recorded and arranged the track at his home studio in Tuve, Sweden. The verses are accompanied by underlying Mellotron keyboard tones, and the chorus is supported by lush staccato strings, with Bylund taking inspiration from Coldplay for the chorus's chords. Alexis Petridis from The Guardian compared the song's drums to those of "Be My Baby" by the Ronettes.

The lyrics are about Swift's plea for her lover to remember her, despite the inevitable end of their relationship. Singing with breathy vocals in a falsetto register, Swift falls in love with a man who is "bad, but...does it so well". She observes in the first verse, "I can see the end as it begins," knowing that her love interest is not suitable for her. Swift warns him that he will be the victim of haunting memories once the relationship ends. For Slant Magazine Annie Galvin, Swift's luscious breathy vocals in a falsetto register are atypical of her usual singing style.

Release and commercial performance
"Wildest Dreams" first charted at number 76 on the Billboard Hot 100 as an album cut from 1989 in November 2014. Swift announced on August 5, 2015, that "Wildest Dreams" would be the fifth single from 1989, following four Hot 100 top-10 and pop songs airplay number-one singles: "Shake It Off", "Blank Space", "Style" and "Bad Blood". The song was slightly remixed and was released to US hot adult contemporary radio on August 31, 2015, by Big Machine and Republic Records. The following day, it impacted US contemporary hit radio. The single was further supported by a remix by R3hab, released for digital download on October 15, 2015. "Wildest Dreams" was released to Italian radio on October 30, 2015, by Universal Music Group.

Following its release as an official single, "Wildest Dreams" re-entered the Billboard Hot 100 at number 15 on the chart dated September 19, 2015. It reached number ten on the chart dated October 10, 2015, becoming 1989 fifth consecutive top-ten hit. The single peaked at number five on the chart dated November 7, 2015, when it reached number one on Billboard pop airplay-focused charts: Mainstream Top 40 and Adult Top 40. With this achievement, 1989 became the album with the most Adult Top 40 number-one songs (five), tying with Katy Perry's 2010 album Teenage Dream. On Billboard's Dance/Mix Show Airplay chart, the single became Swift's first number one, supported by the R3hab remix. Swift became the first female artist to score five Dance/Mix top-10 hits in a calendar year, with 1989 four previous singles all reaching the top 10. "Wildest Dreams" was certified four times platinum by the Recording Industry Association of America (RIAA), and had sold two million digital copies in the United States by November 2017.

"Wildest Dreams" peaked within the top five on record charts of Australia (three), Poland (three), Canada (four), and South Africa (five). The single was certified double platinum in Australia, platinum in Canada, and gold in New Zealand and the United Kingdom.

Critical reception
Contemporary critics received "Wildest Dreams" with positive reviews. Sputnikmusic called the song an "impassioned piece" and wrote, "all it really proves is that Swift is capable of taking the contemporary influences around her and molding them into something impressively original." The Arizona Republic writer Ed Masley described the song as an alluring track. Alexis Petridis of The Guardian praised the wit of the lyrics: "there's something hugely cheering about the way Swift turns the [Lana Del Rey-style] persona of the pathetic female appendage snivelling over her bad-boy boyfriend on its head." In a review by The New York Times, Jon Caramanica noted that this song contained the "most pronounced vocal tweak" on the album and how "at the bridge, she skips up an octave, sputtering out bleats of ecstasy, before retreating back under the covers".

Craig Manning of AbsolutePunk dismissed the song as "a bit disposable". Jem Aswad of Billboard was somewhat disappointed with the production, which they found to be similar to the music of Lana Del Rey, saying: "it's hard to tell if the song is homage or parody." Annie Galvin from Slant Magazine similarly regarded the song as a "misguided" imitation of Del Rey, but praised Swift's vocals that complement the narrative lyrics. Slate writer Forrest Wickman praised the production, but found the song lacking Swift's traditionally vivid songwriting. Sharing a similar sentiment, Mikael Wood of the Los Angeles Times dismissed the song as generic. Shane Kimberline from musicOMH considered "Wildest Dreams" the album's weakest song, feeling that Swift's falsetto was the "sonic equivalent of watching your sister wear heavy makeup and talk with a posh accent".

Retrospectively, Rob Sheffield of Rolling Stone wrote that the song "sounds stronger and stronger over the years". NME critic Hannah Mylrae called the song a "synth-pop beauty", and Nate Jones from Vulture considered "Wildest Dreams" one of Swift's ten strongest songs in her catalog, describing its "invigorating double-time bridge" as the best on 1989. The song was one of the award-winning songs at the 2016 BMI Awards, where Swift was honored as the Songwriter of the Year. It was also awarded at the 2017 ASCAP Awards for the songwriters, Swift, Martin and Shellback. In a 2021 list ranking the best song bridges of the 21st-century, Billboard placed "Wildest Dreams" at number 66.

Music video

Development and synopsis

The accompanying music video was directed by Joseph Kahn, who had previously assumed the role for the music videos for the singles "Blank Space" and "Bad Blood" from 1989. The music video was filmed primarily in the Serengeti plain in Tanzania, with additional shots filmed in Los Angeles and New Zealand. The video premiered on television during the pre-show of the 2015 MTV Video Music Awards on August 31, 2015. Scott Eastwood appeared in the video as Swift's love interest. In the video, Swift plays a fictional actress named Marjorie Finn which is a reference to her grandmother, Marjorie Finlay, and Eastwood plays a fictional actor named Robert Kingsley, combining Swift's grandfather's name Robert and her father's middle name Kingsley. Swift came up with the concept after reading The Secret Conversations (2013), a memoir book of actress Ava Gardner who co-wrote it with journalist Peter Evans. Her premise for the video was that, since social media did not exist in the 1950s, it would be impossible for actors to not fall in love if they were isolated together in Africa.

According to Kahn, the video is based on classic Hollywood romances like Elizabeth Taylor and Richard Burton, as well as classic films such as The African Queen (1951), Out of Africa (1985) and The English Patient (1996). Set in Africa during the classical Hollywood era of the 1950s, the video follows the story of Marjorie Finn (Swift), a brunette actress shooting a romantic adventure film, Wildest Dreams (a reference to the 1985 film Out of Africa), with co-star Robert Kingsley (Eastwood). The video is interspersed with shots of African wildlife and natural scenery, including a cascading waterfall and Swift lounging with a lion. Finn and Kingsley fall in love, but after a fight on set, the romance ends. At the premiere of Wildest Dreams in the United States, Finn sees her co-star, Kingsley, with his wife. Finn is visibly upset but tries to act nonchalant. As they both watch the film, Finn flees the premiere and gets into a waiting limousine. The video ends with a shot of the limousine's side-mirror showing Kingsley running into the street and watching as the car drives away. Swift donated all of the proceeds from the video to wild animal conservation efforts through the African Parks Foundation of America.

Reception and criticism
Media outlets praised the video's production. Slate Forrest Whickman found that the video was "a lot more engaging" and that "it does a good job matching the song's theme of lingering on with someone 'even if it's just pretend'." Mike Wass of Idolator called the video "a much stronger effort" than Swift's previous videos and likened it to romance films Out of Africa, The English Patient and The Notebook (2004). While saying "it all hangs together rather nicely", he highlighted the scenery, which "raises this above your average video". Rolling Stone writer Brittany Spanos felt that the video's visuals emulated "retro Hollywood glamour". The video was nominated for Best Fresh Video at the 2016 MTV Italian Music Awards.

The video attracted criticism, with allegations of glorifying colonialism due to featuring a mainly white cast in Africa. Writing for NPR, Viviane Rutabingwa and James Kassaga Arinaitwe criticized the video for "present[ing] a glamorous version of the white colonial fantasy of Africa" and ignoring the brutality of colonialism. They wrote, "We don't totally blame Taylor Swift, but the people behind the video should have done a little more research. They should have wondered how Africans would react. This nostalgia that privileged white people have for colonial Africa is awkwardly confusing to say the least and offensive to say the most." Lauren Duca of HuffPost similarly criticized the video for bringing back "white colonialism", alleging Swift of eschewing the nuances of cultural appropriation for an outright offensive move. Lauretta Charlton of Vulture defended the video, feeling that the accusations were overblown and recommending the audience to "take a deep breath, exhale, and direct our rage toward something that matters". In response to the allegations, Kahn asserted that the video's emphasis was "a love story", and that featuring a black cast would be historically inaccurate for the 1950s settings.

Live performances and other versions

Swift performed a stripped-down rendition of "Wildest Dreams" on an electric guitar as part of the "Taylor Swift Experience" exhibition at the Grammy Museum at L.A. Live on September 30, 2015. She included the song on the set list of The 1989 World Tour (2015), where she performed "Wildest Dreams" as part of a mashup with "Enchanted", a song from her third studio album, Speak Now (2010). Swift also performed "Wildest Dreams" three times on her Reputation Stadium Tour (2018), as part of the "surprise songs" that were outside of the recurring set list for the whole tour. The performances were at the first show at Santa Clara, California; the second show in Tokyo, Japan; and the second show in Philadelphia, when a stage device malfunctioned. The song was also performed on the Eras Tour (2023).

Rock singer Ryan Adams covered "Wildest Dreams" for his track-by-track cover album of Swift's 1989, released in September 2015. Adams switches and adjusts pronouns in some places, for example "Standing in a nice dress" becomes "Standing in your nice dress." His version is an alt-country song featuring acoustic instruments and a melancholic production. The Atlantic critic Spencer Kornharber found the cover "undeniably lovely."

Credits and personnel
Credits are adapted from liner notes of 1989.

Taylor Swift – vocals, writer, heart sounds
Max Martin – producer, writer, keyboard, piano, programming
Shellback – producer, writer, acoustic guitar, electric guitar, keyboard, percussion, programming
Mattias Bylund – Strings arrangement, recording, and editing
Michael Ilbert – recording

Sam Holland – recording
Cory Bice – assistant recording
Serban Ghenea – mixing
John Hanes – engineered for mix
Tom Coyne – mastering

Charts

Weekly charts

Year-end charts

Certifications and sales

"Wildest Dreams (Taylor's Version)"

A re-recorded version of "Wildest Dreams", titled "Wildest Dreams (Taylor's Version)", was released by Swift on September 17, 2021, via Republic Records. It was a surprise release, and a part of the re-recorded music from Swift following the dispute over the ownership of the masters of her older discography. "Wildest Dreams (Taylor's Version)" charted within the top 10 in Malaysia and Singapore, the top 20 in Ireland, and the top 40 in Australia, Canada, New Zealand, the United Kingdom, and the United States.

Background and release
Following the dispute with Big Machine Records in 2019 over the rights to the masters of her first six albums, including 1989, Swift announced her goal to re-record each of these albums. The first snippet of "Wildest Dreams (Taylor's Version)" was featured in the trailer for the 2021 animated film Spirit Untamed, released on March 12, 2021. A longer one minute and fifty-nine second clip was uploaded to DreamWorks' official YouTube channel on May 17, 2021.

On September 15, 2021, following a viral TikTok trend involving the 2014 recording of the song that was gaining traction on the platform, "Wildest Dreams" received 735,000 plays on Spotify, a new single-day peak for the song on the streaming service. On September 16, it reached a new peak at 750,000 plays. On September 17, Swift posted on her TikTok account a snippet of the re-recorded song's bridge as part of the aforementioned trend, captioned "if you guys want to use my version of wildest dreams for the slow zoom trend, here she is!", followed by "felt cute might drop the whole song later", hinting at the song's forthcoming release. The song was subsequently made available to streaming platforms approximately an hour after the TikTok post. Regarding her next upcoming record being Red (Taylor's Version) (2021), Swift said via her social media accounts that she saw "Wildest Dreams" trending on TikTok and thought fans should have her version of the song.

Critical reception
"Wildest Dreams (Taylor's Version)" received positive reviews, most observing Swift's improved and refined vocal delivery. Althea Legaspi of Rolling Stone described the track as a dreamy synth-pop song with its romantic sentiment "Taylor-made for a dramatic effect that feels like a movie moment". The staff of Consequence deemed the song their "song of the week" and commented, "She's taken great care to capture the sound of the original, right down to a riff in the second chorus", further stating that the song displays her improved vocals. Euphoria Magazine's Kenzie Bright opined that Swift's matured voice pairs with the crisper, shiner and bolder instrumentals of the track. Robin Murray of Clash noted that the song contains only "subtle stylist shifts" from the original version but was impressed by the vocal delivery. Stereogums Tom Breihan described the song as a muted version of the original.

Commercial performance
Within less than four hours, "Wildest Dreams (Taylor's Version)" amassed over two million streams on Spotify, handily surpassing the original version's biggest single-day streaming tally on the platform. In the United States, it debuted at number 37 on the Billboard Hot 100 with 8.7 million on-demand streams and 13,400 downloads sold in the week ending September 23, 2021. It became her record-extending 138th entry on the Hot 100, and her 81st entry into the top-40, which tied her with Elvis Presley for the third-most top-40 entries of all time, behind Drake (143) and Lil Wayne (87). The song further landed at numbers 3 and 37 on the US Billboard Digital Song Sales and Streaming Songs charts, respectively. "Wildest Dreams (Taylor's Version)" peaked within the top 40 in Australia (28) and New Zealand (30). It surpassed the original version's peak chart positions in Hungary (29 versus 35), the United Kingdom (25 versus 40), and Ireland (15 versus 39). In Germany and Sweden, where the chart performance of the original and the re-recording are combined together, "Wildest Dreams" peaked at numbers 51 and 53, respectively.

Credits and personnel
Credits are adapted from Tidal.

 Taylor Swift – lead vocals, songwriting, production
 Christopher Rowe – production, vocal engineering
 Shellback – songwriting, production
 Max Martin – songwriting
 Mattias Bylund – record engineering, editing, strings arrangement, synthesizer
 Max Bernstein – guitar, synthesizer, synthesizer programming
 Mike Meadows – synthesizer, synthesizer programming
 Dan Burns – synthesizer programming
 Matt Billingslea – drums, percussion
 Amos Heller – bass
 Paul Sidoti – guitar
 Mattias Johansson – violin
 David Bukovinszky – cello
 Serban Ghenea – mixing
 John Hanes – engineering
 Randy Merrill – master engineering

Charts

Certifications

Usage in media 
An instrumental, mainly orchestral, rendition of "Wildest Dreams" was featured on the soundtrack of Netflix period series Bridgerton (2020). "Wildest Dreams (Taylor's Version)" was used in the trailers of 2021 animated adventure film, Spirit Untamed, and in an episode in the second season of the 2022 teen drama series, Fate: The Winx Saga.

Release history

See also
List of Billboard Mainstream Top 40 number-one songs of 2015
List of Billboard Hot 100 top-ten singles in 2015

References

2010s ballads
2020s ballads
2014 songs
2015 singles
Taylor Swift songs
Songs about dreams
Song recordings produced by Max Martin
Song recordings produced by Shellback (record producer)
Song recordings produced by Taylor Swift
Song recordings produced by Chris Rowe
Songs written by Taylor Swift
Songs written by Max Martin
Songs written by Shellback (record producer)
Music videos directed by Joseph Kahn
Dream pop songs
American synth-pop songs
Ryan Adams songs
Big Machine Records singles
Republic Records singles
Music video controversies
Synth-pop ballads
African Parks (organisation)
Race-related controversies in music
Charity singles